Kumkuma, also known as Kungumam, most often refers to a red colour powder used for social and religious markings in India.

Kumkuma or kumkum may also refer to:

 Kumkum (actress) (1934–2020), Indian actress
 Kumkum - Ek Pyara Sa Bandhan (2002–2009), an Indian television series
 Kunkhumam, a 1963 Indian Tamil-language film
 Kungumam (magazine), a Tamil weekly entertainment magazine